Maximovka is a rural locality (a selo) and the administrative center of Maximovskoye Rural Settlement, Shebekinsky District, Belgorod Oblast, Russia. The population was 850 as of 2010. There are 7 streets.

Geography 
Maximovka is located 44 km northeast of Shebekino (the district's administrative centre) by road. Shemrayevka is the nearest rural locality.

References 

Rural localities in Shebekinsky District